A number of forms of horse racing are carried out in Australia:
Thoroughbred racing in Australia
Harness racing in Australia
Steeplechase racing in Australia